is a 2010 Japanese time travel comedy film, directed by Yoshihiro Nakamura.

Plot
Based on a manga by Gen Araki, the film chronicles the adventures of a samurai who accidentally travels through time from Edo-era Japan to present-day Japan where he meets a single working mother and her young son.

Cast
 Ryo Nishikido - Kijima Yasube
 Rie Tomosaka - Hiroko Yusa
 Fuku Suzuki - Tomoya Yusa
 Jun Inoue - Tonoma Tomoharu (teacher)
 Keisuke Horibe - Shirozaki
 Hiroki Konno - Tanaka  
 Hitomi Satō - Yoshie Hiraishi
 Yūji Nakamura - TV presenter 
 Shiori Kutsuna

References

External links
  
 

2010 films
Live-action films based on manga
Films directed by Yoshihiro Nakamura
2010s Japanese films
2010s Japanese-language films